Desulfofaba fastidiosa is a bacterium from the genus of Desulfofaba which has been isolated from sediments in Denmark.

References

Further reading

External links 
Type strain of Desulfofaba fastidiosa at BacDive -  the Bacterial Diversity Metadatabase

Desulfobacterales
Bacteria described in 2004